Abdiwali Olad Kanyare (15 May 1980 – 7 May 2020) was a Somali footballer who played as a goalkeeper for the Somalia national team. After his retirement, he became a prominent goalkeeping coach.

Career
Domestically, Olad Kanyare played for Bariga Dhexe, Horseed and Banadir. Olad Kanyare represented the Somalia national football team, before his international retirement in 2015. Following his playing career, Olad Kanyare became goalkeeping coach for Somalia's youth teams. He had the same role at Mogadishu City Club at the time of his death.

Death
On 7 May 2020, Olad Kanyare was shot dead in a mosque in Afgooye by unknown assailants whilst performing tarawih prayers as part of Ramadan. He was laid to rest the following day.

References

1980 births
2020 deaths
Association football goalkeepers
Somalian footballers
Somalia international footballers
Terrorism deaths in Somalia
Association football goalkeeping coaches
Deaths by firearm in Somalia
Somalian murder victims
Male murder victims
Somalian Muslims